Jhonen C. Vasquez (born September 1, 1974) is an American cartoonist, animator, screenwriter, music video director, and voice actor. He is best known for creating the comic book Johnny the Homicidal Maniac—along with its spin-off comics Squee!, Fillerbunny, and I Feel Sick—and the Nickelodeon animated series Invader Zim.

Early life
Vasquez was born on September 1, 1974, in San Jose, California. He grew up in East San Jose and attended Mt. Pleasant High School, where he often spent much of his class time drawing in sketchbooks and took part in a contest to design a new look for his school's mascot. He earned no prizes, but on the back of a preliminary drawing for the contest, he drew his first sketch of the character who would later become Johnny C who would later star in Vasquez's first completed comic book series. While Vasquez read his older brother's superhero comics as a child, but first became interested in exploring the medium through the original independent Teenage Mutant Ninja Turtles comics by Peter Laird and Kevin Eastman:

Vasquez's high school student newspaper published a number of his comic strips featuring Johnny C, titled Johnny the Little Homicidal Maniac. After graduating in 1992, Vasquez became a film student at De Anza College in Cupertino, California. He also created Happy Noodle Boy while attending Mt. Pleasant. Despite having little formal artistic training, he soon dropped out of De Anza to pursue a career as a professional cartoonist. He met Roman Dirge, Rosearik Rikki Simons, and Simons' wife Tavisha at Alternative Press Expo in 1995. Dirge later became a writer on Vasquez's series Invader Zim, while Simons became a member of the show's coloring team and the voice of the title character's crazed robot sidekick, GIR. Simons also worked with Vasquez on the coloring seen in his two-issue comic I Feel Sick. By September 1996, Vasquez announced in his introductory text to the sixth issue of Johnny the Homicidal Maniac that he had reached sufficient success to be able to quit his day job and focus on his art.

Vasquez is Mexican-American.

Career

Comics
Carpe Noctem magazine published early one-page strips featuring Johnny in the early 1990s. In 1995, Slave Labor Graphics began publishing a series of Johnny comics after Vasquez submitted samples of his artwork to them. Vasquez's first comic, Johnny the Homicidal Maniac, ran for seven issues and was collected as a hardcover and a trade paperback book named Johnny the Homicidal Maniac: Director's Cut. The cover features the logo "Z?", meaning "question sleep", which appears frequently throughout Vasquez's work and relates to his characters' insomnia and his own hypnophobia. The series follows Johnny as he searches for meaning in his life, a quest that frequently leads to the violent deaths of those around him as well as, briefly, his own. A photograph of one of Vasquez's friends, Leah England, serves as the middle of a portrait collection on the cover for the second issue of Johnny the Homicidal Maniac. England also gave Vasquez the inspiration for a filler strip about a child who was dangerously afraid of losing sight of his mother, as well as the notorious "Meanwhile" filler piece in the second issue of Johnny the Homicidal Maniac. Vasquez's next project was The Bad Art Collection, a 16-page one-shot comic. He stated that he did the book's art while he was in high school to discourage classmates from asking him to draw for them.

In 1997, Vasquez gave Squee, a supporting character from Johnny the Homicidal Maniac, his own four-issue series. It chronicles Squee's encounters with aliens, Satan's son, and eventually Satan himself. The trade version (which features a cover image of Squee with the words "Buy me or I'll die!") contains, in addition to the actual Squee comics, the Meanwhiles that were left out of the Director's Cut of Johnny the Homicidal Maniac, as well as comics of Vasquez's "real life" and Wobbly-Headed Bob. Vasquez's next project was I Feel Sick, colored by Rikki Simons. I Feel Sick follows a tortured artist named Devi (another character introduced in Johnny the Homicidal Maniac) as she tries to maintain her sanity in an insane vision of society, despite conversing with Sickness, one of her own paintings. Slave Labor has published three Fillerbunny mini-comics, the third having been released in March 2005. The mini-comic was a spin-off of a filler comic designed to replace a vacant page usually reserved for advertising space in the Squee! comics.

Vasquez said at the 2007 New York Comic Con that the original Fillerbunny comics would be done in a single night and he would rush through and do whatever he could in a small amount of time. The third issue, however, broke this mold. According to the introduction, it took over nine months to complete, and he feels it is of much higher quality than the first two. At Comic-Con 2005, Vasquez mentioned that his next comic was a love story. Since this, however, he attended an event in early 2007 and stated he was not working on his "own" comics – he was collaborating on two comics in the style of Everything Can Be Beaten, acting only as author. The first, titled Jellyfist, was intended for release on July 25, 2007, but the initial print run of Jellyfist was incredibly poor, and so it was re-released in October 2007. In 2009, Vasquez collaborated with other alternative artists in Marvel Comics' Strange Tales, issue 2 of 3, with a story about MODOK. It sold extremely well and all three issues have been collected into a hardcover trade paperback. The next year he returned for Marvel's Strange Tales II, issue 1 of 3, with a story about Wolverine.

In 2012, DC Comics announced that Vasquez joined the writing team for their digital comic Beyond the Fringe, based on the Fox TV series Fringe. In May 2014, Vasquez announced on his Tumblr page that he would be re-releasing his previous Fillerbunny comics into a new collection and additionally releasing his first new comic book in ten years.

Television
At Nickelodeon, Vasquez created the animated television series Invader Zim, which aired on the network and then later on Nicktoons. It focuses on the daily life of Zim, a naïve alien from the planet Irk who tries to conquer Earth and enslave humans, before his attempts are constantly thwarted by a young paranormal investigator Dib, who believes that Zim is an alien but no one believes him. The first episode aired on March 30, 2001. The series lasted for two seasons, before it was cancelled by Nickelodeon, saying that its main causes were low ratings, over-budget production and lack of interest in continuation of the series. The last episode before the show's cancellation, "The Most Horrible X-Mas Ever" (a Christmas special), aired on December 10, 2002. Episodes of the third season and a finale then remained unfinished. Vasquez provided the voices for Zim's computer, Old Kid, Minimoose, and various characters including himself as a background character (being credited as "Mr. Scolex"). Vasquez later returned to Nickelodeon in 2016 to write Invader Zim: Enter the Florpus, a TV movie based on Invader Zim.

Vasquez also did character designs for the Disney XD show Randy Cunningham: 9th Grade Ninja, as well as wrote for an episode of the online series Bravest Warriors. In July 2014, it was revealed that Disney Television Animation had picked up the pilot Very Important House, co-created by Vasquez and Rick and Morty production designer Jenny Goldberg, who previously collaborated with Vasquez on Jellyfist. However, on September 30, 2016, Vasquez announced on his official blog that Very Important House was ultimately not picked up for a full series.

Other work
Vasquez collaborated with Crab Scrambly to produce the storybook Everything Can Be Beaten, published by Slave Labor in 2002. Vasquez, credited as Chancre Scolex, wrote the story and Crab Scrambly illustrated it. Everything Can Be Beaten is about a strange person who lives in a room in which he can do nothing but beat kittens. However, an adventure into the outside world changes his perspective, and he discovers that "everything can be beaten". The storybook inspired Urban Squall in 2008 to create the puzzle browser game Bloody Fun Day. Vasquez did the entire artwork for the deluxe edition of the Mindless Self Indulgence album If as well as the digital single "Mastermind". He also directed the music videos for Mindless Self Indulgence's "Shut Me Up" and The Left Rights' "White". Jhonen made the cover art for the album Zero Day by MC Frontalot and also indicated that he shows his artwork in galleries from time to time. He also did an art rendition of BioShock 2 called "The Sisters". He was quoted saying the following about the rendition:

He also worked on a Teenage Mutant Ninja Turtles short called Don Vs Raph, where Donatello and Raphael compete to see who is better, but the two always end up tying.

Style
Many of the characters in Vasquez's cartoons are usually highly geometric and thin, nearly to the point of being stick figures with heavy black outlines. The protagonists in his comics are typically mentally unstable characters who live in dysfunctional societies, and whose manias are able to speak through inanimate objects. His storylines tend to follow the basic black comedy formula. His art style is very edgy and eccentric, and smiley faces are often found in his artwork, trying to evoke an ironic sense of happiness in a world of chaos and darkness. Vasquez's writing often conveys misanthropic and pessimistic themes, often used for the purposes of parody and satire. Several of his works have featured goth characters or depictions of the goth subculture for the purpose of satire. In an interview on the show The Screen Savers in 2005, Vasquez responded to host Kevin Pereira's comment that fans considered him "a goth king", saying jokingly, "King, yeah, but not goth... I mean, that's arrogant."

Bibliography

Filmography

Awards and nominations
 Squee! was nominated for 1998 Eisner Awards for Best New Series and Best Humor Publication.
 I Feel Sick won an International Horror Guild Award in 2000 for Best Illustrated Narrative.
 Invader Zim won an Emmy, an Annie, and the award for Best Title Sequence at the 2001 World Animation Celebration awards. It also garnered seven other nominations.
 Vasquez and his work were honored in the National Design Triennial: Inside Design Now, a 2003 exhibition at the Cooper-Hewitt National Design Museum, Smithsonian Institution.
 Vasquez received the Inkpot Award in 2015.

References

External links
 
 
 An Interview on SuicideGirls.com
 Revolution Science Fiction (October 26, 2001): "Death and Morons: The Jhonen Vasquez Story" (online-chat transcript)
 Jhonen Vasquez Spotlight (2007 New York Comic Con speech Podcast. 54:12m) Downloadable mp3
 Interrogation Special with Zoetica Ebb (August 22, 2007)

1974 births
Living people
American comics artists
American comics writers
Writers from San Jose, California
De Anza College alumni
American artists of Mexican descent
Slave Labor Graphics
Showrunners
American music video directors
American people of Venezuelan descent
American writers of Mexican descent
Alternative cartoonists
American people of Mexican descent
Animators from California
Hispanic and Latino American artists
Hispanic and Latino American writers
Hispanic and Latino American people
Inkpot Award winners